Ludwik Gintel (26 September 1899 – 11 July 1973) was a Polish Olympic footballer.

Early and personal life
Gintel was born Kraków. He was Jewish. He worked as an architect and bank clerk.

Football career
Gintel began his football career playing for the Jewish Sports Association Jutrzenka Kraków. He then played 328 games for KS Cracovia, until 1931, as a right-back (later forward). With KS Cracovia, he was twice the champion of Poland (1921 and 1930). In 1928, he was Poland's top scorer.

He was also capped 12 times for the Poland national team, making eight official appearances. Included among his appearances for the team was in their first-ever Olympic appearance at the 1924 Olympic Games.

After football career
After the World War II broke out, he emigrated to Palestine. He died in Tel Aviv, Israel, in 1973.

See also
List of select Jewish football (association; soccer) players

References

1899 births
1973 deaths
Footballers from Kraków
People from the Kingdom of Galicia and Lodomeria
Polish Jews
Austro-Hungarian Jews
Polish emigrants to Mandatory Palestine
Jews in Mandatory Palestine
Israeli people of Polish-Jewish descent
Association football fullbacks
Association football forwards
Polish footballers
Jewish footballers
Poland international footballers
Jutrzenka Kraków players
MKS Cracovia (football) players
Olympic footballers of Poland
Footballers at the 1924 Summer Olympics
Ekstraklasa players